Turbia is a Colombian streaming television series that premiered on Vix+ on 25 August 2022. Set in Cali, Colombia, the series centers on an environmental and social crisis due to water shortages resulting from a drought of several months.

Plot 
In Cali, a drought has caused the city to go into crisis. Despite harsh conditions, the citizens carry on with their daily lives. A privileged zone houses the wealthiest and powerful citizens, while the "dry zone" houses the rest of the population. The dry zone lacks drinkable water and is reaching the highest levels of violence and corruption.

Episodes

References

External links 
 

2020s Colombian television series
2022 Colombian television series debuts
Spanish-language television shows
Vix (streaming service) original programming